Eddie og Suzanne is a 1975 Norwegian drama film written and directed by Arild Kristo, starring Sverre Horge and Yvonne Sparrbåge. The film, a road movie inspired by such films as Bonnie and Clyde and Easy Rider, has been called a "modernist classic" of Norwegian cinema.

Eddie (Horge) is a young Norwegian man who has recently been released from prison, and moves to Sweden to start a new life. At a disco, he meets Suzanne (Sparrbåge) and the two fall in love. Suzanne's father, however, is a tyrannical policeman who tries to put an end to the relationship, so the two elope to France.

References

External links
 
 
 Eddie og Suzanne at the Norwegian Film Institute

1975 films
1975 drama films
Norwegian drama films
1970s Norwegian-language films